Laszlo Hodos (born 6 June 1966) is a Romanian bobsledder. He competed in the four man event at the 1992 Winter Olympics.

References

1966 births
Living people
Romanian male bobsledders
Olympic bobsledders of Romania
Bobsledders at the 1992 Winter Olympics
Sportspeople from Târgu Mureș